Nayana Shakya (born May 10, 1982) is a Nepalese former swimmer, who specialized in breaststroke events. Shakya qualified for the women's 100 m breaststroke at the 2004 Summer Olympics in Athens, by receiving a Universality place from FINA, in an entry time of 1:34.99. She challenged seven other swimmers in heat one, including Bolivia's Katerine Moreno, who competed at her third Olympics since 1988. She posted a lifetime best of 1:32.92 to edge out Rwanda's Pamela Girimbabazi for a seventh seed by nearly 18 seconds. Shakya failed to advance into the semifinals, as she placed forty-seventh overall in the preliminaries.

She was also a member of the Nepal basketball team until 2014.

References

External links
 

1982 births
Living people
Nepalese female swimmers
Olympic swimmers of Nepal
Swimmers at the 2004 Summer Olympics
Swimmers at the 2002 Asian Games
Female breaststroke swimmers
Sportspeople from Kathmandu
Basketball players at the 2014 Asian Games
Asian Games competitors for Nepal
21st-century Nepalese women